The Battle of Baitag Bogd Mountain or Beitashan Incident (alternatively Baitak Bogdo incident) was a border conflict between China, Mongolia, and the Soviet Union. The Mongolian People's Republic became involved in a border dispute with the Republic of China, as a Chinese Muslim Hui cavalry regiment was sent by the Chinese government to attack Mongolian and Soviet positions.

There had always been a Chinese police force stationed at a Xinjiang police station with Chinese sentry posts before and after 1945.

As commander of the First Cavalry Division, Salar Muslim Major General Han Youwen was sent to Baitag Bogd by the Kuomintang military command to reinforce Hui Muslim General Ma Xizhen with a company of troops, approximately three months before the fighting broke out. At Baitag Bogd, Han Youwen was in command of all Muslim cavalry defending against Soviet and Mongol forces.

Chinese Muslim and Turkic Kazakh forces working for the Chinese Kuomintang battled Soviet and Mongol troops. In June 1947 the Mongols and the Soviets launched an attack against the Kazakhs, driving them back to the Chinese side. However, fighting continued for another year, 13 clashes taking place between 5 June 1947 and July 1948.

Mongolia invaded Xinjiang with the intention of assisting Li Rihan, the pro-Soviet Special Commissioner, in gaining control of Xinjiang, over Special Commissioner Us Man (Osman) who was pro-ROC. The Chinese defence ministry spokesman announced that Outer Mongolian soldiers have captured Pei-ta-shan, and stated that troops were resisting near Pei-ta-shan.

Elite Qinghai Chinese Muslim cavalry were sent by the Chinese Kuomintang to destroy the Mongols and the Soviets in 1947.

In early June 1947 Pei-ta-shan was re-taken by Chinese troops, who continued to fight against Soviet and Mongolian bomber planes; China's Legislative Yuan demanded stronger policies against the Soviet Union in response to the Mongol invasion. The bombs started dropping from Mongol and Soviet planes on 5 June.

Republic of China forces took eight Outer Mongolian troops prisoner while 30 horses and two Republic of China soldiers died in a bombing. The Republic of China issued a protest against the border attack by the Mongols and Soviets. The Republic of China accused Soviet planes of being involved in the attack. The American ambassador to China branded the Outer Mongolian state as a tool and arm of the Soviet Union. The Soviets were aiming their intervention against the Kazakhs. Chinese Gen. Sung displayed captured Soviet-style Mongolian military headgear and a Soviet map to the American ambassador. The Soviet Tass news agency claimed that Mongolian officers were gruesomely murdered and mutilated. Douglas Mackiernan was sent to Baitag Bogd on 19 June 1947. The Mongolians possessed Soviet weapons which were seized from Soviet troops in battle. The Kazakhs were suffering from a dearth of edible supplies. The entire Baitag Bogd was threatened by Outer Mongol occupation according to Kazakh leader Osman.

Chinese Gen. Ma Xizhen and Kazakh Osman Batur fought against the Mongol troops and airplanes throughout June as fierce fighting erupted. The MPR used a battalion-size force and had Soviet air support in June 1947. The Mongolians repeatedly probed the Chinese lines.

The border constantly shifted around the area. In January 1948 seven hundred Chinese cavalry crossed the border into Khobdo and battled Mongolian border posts. Osman continued to fight against the Uyghur forces of the Yili regime in north Ashan after being defeated by the Soviet forces.

See also
Ili Rebellion

References

Bibliography

China–Soviet Union relations
Baitag Bogd
Mongolia–Soviet Union relations
Baitag Bogd
Baitag Bogd
Baitag Bogd
1940s in Mongolia
1946 in China
1947 in China
1948 in China
Baitag Bogd
Baitag Bogd
Baitag Bogd